Kalāla is situated in the North-West Frontier Province of Pakistan.

References
Kalāla at Geonames name server

Populated places in Khyber Pakhtunkhwa
Villages in Khyber Pakhtunkhwa